Leimanis is a surname. Notable people with the surname include:

Aivars Leimanis (born 1958), Latvian ballet dancer
Aleksandrs Leimanis (1913–1990), Latvian film director
Eizens Leimanis (1905–1992), Latvian mathematician
Toms Leimanis (born 1994), Latvian basketball player